All Saints’ Church, Gosforth is a Church of England (Anglican) parish church in the suburb of Gosforth, which lies to the north of the City of Newcastle upon Tyne. All Saints’ is part of the Diocese of Newcastle and within the Newcastle Central Deanery. It has served the community of Gosforth since being consecrated in 1887. The building is an example of Gothic Revival architecture constructed between 1885 and 1887. The tower is later, of 1896, and has a ring of ten bells. The interior has Victorian wood carvings by Ralph Hedley, an organ by Harrison & Harrison and stained glass windows depicting the saints throughout the ages. Alongside the church building is an Edwardian church hall, a garden of remembrance and church green.

History
Various historians  have indicated that the parish church of St. Nicholas in South Gosforth was built on the remains of a Saxon Church and is the earliest church in the district. In 1882, the Revd Frederick Wood Bindley, the new vicar of St. Nicholas began major restoration on the church, prompting questions about the size of the parish church. In the nineteenth century the population of the original parish increased from just over a thousand to an estimated six thousand,  with the development of farming, mining and trading communities to the west of the Great North Road. A committee was formed to plan the construction of a new church, and William Cochrane, a mining engineer, was appointed as honorary secretary.

The church was designed by the diocesan architect Robert J. Johnson and the press claimed that the people of Gosforth could now boast that they possessed “one of the finest modern churches in the north of England”.  The church was consecrated as All Saints on 2 October 1887. In later years, All Saints became the mother church of four more churches in Gosforth. The architectural historian Nikolaus Pevsner described All Saints as "a good, competent example of the large late Victorian ecclesiastical building". The church has a Grade II listing.

References

Sources

External links
 Church Website

Grade II listed churches in Tyne and Wear